National Public Senior Secondary School (or NPS) was established on 24 August 1981 in Hanumangarh Junction, Rajasthan, India. NPS was the first English medium school in the city and is run and managed by a trust. 

The school prepares the students for the Central Board of Secondary Education(CBSE) from nursery years through class XII in streams of Arts, Science and Commerce.

Campus and facilities
The campus is spread over 14 acres. There are classrooms, library, and courts for volleyball, badminton, and basketball. The institute has laboratories of physics, biology, chemistry and computer science. There is a music-room with instruments. The institute provides bus facilities to the students coming from areas of the town. An auditorium, the biggest in the district headquarters, is part of the campus.

Faculty
The faculty of 65 teaches 1500 students.

Extra-curricular activities
In addition to the annual sports meet and cultural fest, the school organises intra-school competitions of declamation, handwriting, creative writing, speech, drawing and painting.

The children participate in cluster, zonal, national level tournaments organized by the CBSE and have won gold, silver and bronze medals.

Location
The school is located on Court road in Hanumangarh Jn. 
 National Public School Location Map

External links
 National Public School Official website

Schools in Rajasthan
1981 establishments in Rajasthan
Educational institutions established in 1981
Education in Hanumangarh district